Charge It to Me is a 1919 American silent comedy film directed by Roy William Neill and written by L. V. Jefferson. The film stars Margarita Fischer and Emory Johnson. The film was released on May 4, 1919, by  Pathé Exchange.

Plot

Cast
{| 
! style="width: 180px; text-align: left;" |  Actor
! style="width: 230px; text-align: left;" |  Role
|- style="text-align: left;"
|Margarita Fischer||Winnie Davis
|-
|Emory Johnson||Elmer Davis
|-
|Augustus Phillips||Howard Weston
|-
|Lafe McKee||Col. Godfrey Hibbard
|-
|Charles A. Post||Arche Gunn
|-
|Bull Montana||'Corkscrew' McGann
|-
|George Swann||Hercules Strong
|-
|J. Farrell MacDonald||Officer Hennessey
|-
|Sophie Todd||Maggie
|-
|}

Picture Gallery

References

External links

American silent feature films
American black-and-white films
Associated Exhibitors films
Films directed by Roy William Neill
1910s English-language films
1910s American films